Edward Wingfield, 2nd Viscount Powerscourt (23 October 1729 – 6 May 1764), styled The Honourable Edward Wingfield between 1744 and 1751, was an Irish politician.

Wingfield was the son of Richard Wingfield, 1st Viscount Powerscourt, by Dorothy Beresford Rowley, daughter of Hercules Rowley, of Summerhill, County Meath. he was educated at St John's College, Cambridge. He succeeded his father in the viscountcy in 1751. This was an Irish peerage and gave him a seat in the Irish House of Lords. However, he was still able to stand for election for the British House of Commons, and in 1756 he was successfully returned for Stockbridge, a seat he held until 1761.

Lord Powerscourt died unmarried in May 1764, aged 34, and was succeeded in the title by his younger brother, Richard.

References

1729 births
1764 deaths
Viscounts in the Peerage of Ireland
Alumni of St John's College, Cambridge
Members of the Irish House of Lords